Doolittle Mills is an unincorporated community in Oil Township, Perry County, in the U.S. state of Indiana.

History
A post office was established at Doolittle Mills in 1870, and remained in operation until 1967. The community was named for a local family which owned a mill.

Geography

References

Unincorporated communities in Perry County, Indiana
Unincorporated communities in Indiana